Govich may refer to:

Govij (disambiguation), places in Iran
Milena Govich (b. 1976), American actress